The High Sierra Camps are nine rustic lodging facilities located in two national parks and a national monument in California's Sierra Nevada mountain range.  Open most years from June or July to September, they are staffed camps with tent cabins and food service facilities.  The backcountry camps receive their supplies by pack mules.

Seven camps are located in Yosemite National Park.  Five of these camps are located off the road in the wilderness, and are accessible only by hiking or by horseback riding.  There are two similar camps which can be reached by automobile, located near the Tioga Road.

There are also two similar camps to the south of Yosemite, one each in Sequoia National Park and Giant Sequoia National Monument.

History

In 1916, Stephen Mather of the National Park Service made an agreement with a private concessionaire, D. J. Desmond, to build mountain "chalets" at Tenaya Lake, Tuolumne Meadows and Merced Lake.  Desmond's company went bankrupt during World War I, and these first camps closed in 1918.  In 1923, the Park Service decided that the camps should be re-opened and expanded.  Ranger and naturalist Carl Parcher Russell hiked through the region and selected locations for five more camps.  Three of these were built the following year by a new concessionaire, the Yosemite National Park Company.  That firm merged with the Curry Camping Company in 1925, forming the Yosemite Park and Curry Company, which ran the camps for many years under the management of Donald Tresidder, until his death in 1948.

Ansel Adams defended the High Sierra Camps against critics who saw them as an encroachment into the wilderness: "The present High Sierra Camps do not, in my opinion, violate wilderness qualities as they now exist. I personally feel that a High Sierra Camp near the north rim of the Yosemite Valley would be a logical link in the chain."  A camp on the north rim was never built.

In the early years, rates were $1.00 per night and $1.00 per meal.  In 1938, all-inclusive six-day horseback trips cost $46.00 per person.  The rates for 2011 are $151.00 per person per day for lodging, breakfast and dinner, and $15.25 for lunch.  Camps without showers charge $6.00 less per day.  Six day saddle trips are $1603.00.
The Yosemite Park and Curry Company operated the High Sierra Camps.YP&CC remained a Curry Family controlled corporation until the death of Mary Curry Tressider in 1970. After several ownership changes, MCA, Inc. took control of YP&CC in 1973, operating the concession until the NPS awarded a new contract to Delaware North Company in 1993. which has operated the concession ever since, and manages all of the camps except the Sequoia High Sierra Camp.  Demand for reservations at the Yosemite backcountry camps is very high, and a lottery is conducted for reservations, with applications being accepted from September 1 to November 1 of the previous year for reservations the following summer.

The five backcountry camps

These camps, in conjunction with Tuolumne Meadows Lodge, make it possible to "backpack for six days without carrying a backpack. You can carry a day pack and spend each night at one of the High Sierra camps, complete with bedding and meals". These camps provide "a fantastic way for visitors who enjoy a warm bed, a hot shower and a hearty meal to enjoy the beauty of the backcountry."

May Lake High Sierra Camp

The May Lake High Sierra Camp replaced an earlier camp at Tenaya Lake, and was established in July 1938 at a site selected by Donald Tresidder and Mary Curry Tresidder of the Yosemite Park and Curry Company. The camp can accommodate 36 overnight guests.

Mount Hoffmann, named for topographer Charles F. Hoffmann of the California Geological Survey, is located just across May Lake, which is named for the woman Hoffman married, Lucy Mayotta Brown.  Tenaya Peak is also nearby.

Glen Aulin High Sierra Camp

However, the camp was relocated in 1927 a small distance upriver, because the original site had a mosquito problem early in the season. The current site is "graced by a superb waterfall and the lucent pool into which it spills."

Downstream on the Tuolumne River are three more spectacular waterfalls, Waterwheel Falls, California Falls, and Le Conte Falls.

Vogelsang High Sierra Camp

It was first established in 1924 at a site on Booth Lake 300 feet lower, was moved in the early 1930s, and then again in 1940 to its "glorious perch" on Fletcher Creek.

Merced Lake High Sierra Camp

Because of its comparatively low elevation, this camp is relatively warm and is located in a heavily wooded area.

The camp site was originally a US Cavalry patrol outpost beginning in 1905. The site became one of the original hikers' camps built in 1916, and closed in 1918 during World War I.  It reopened as a boys' sports camp in 1922, featuring tennis, basketball, baseball, boating, fishing, hiking and swimming.  Yosemite Park and Curry Company began operating the camp in 1926.

Sunrise High Sierra Camp

The Sunrise High Sierra Camp was the last of the Yosemite camps to be established.

This final link made it possible for hikers to take a six-day wilderness loop trip around the Cathedral Range from the Tuolumne River to the Merced River and back again, without carrying a heavy backpack, since nightly accommodations and meals were available at six points along the way.

Tuolumne Meadows Lodge

Tuolumne Meadows Lodge is located a short distance off the Tioga Road, and is accessible by car.  It is located on the Dana Fork of the Tuolumne River in Tuolumne Meadows at an elevation of 8,600 feet.  It was among the first three camps established in 1916, and is the largest and most popular of the High Sierra Camps.  Due to World War I, the camp was closed from 1918 to 1922.  It has operated continuously (though seasonally) since, including through World War II.

The Glen Aulin High Sierra Camp is located a hiking distance of 7.6 miles north, and the Vogelsang High Sierra Camp is located a hiking distance of 7.2 miles south by the Rafferty Creek trail.

White Wolf High Sierra Camp

The White Wolf High Sierra Camp has an identity somewhat separate from the other six Yosemite camps, because it is located 23.5 miles west of the Glen Aulin High Sierra Camp, and is not usually part of the camp-to-camp hiking tradition.  A settler named John Meyer homesteaded in the area in the 1870s.  It is the oldest of the camps, with its origins in the 1882-1883 mining boom in the Tioga Pass area, when a wagon road was built to the mines, and White Wolf became a stop along that road.  However, the mines soon failed, and Meyer then used the road for cattle drives and to haul supplies to White Wolf.

The National Park Service purchased the road in 1915, and cars began to enter the High Sierra.  Due to a need for gasoline, repairs and campsites, John Meyer's son, also named John Meyer, developed a business along the road including a lodge, kitchen and dining room.  An improved Tioga Road was built in 1938, which bypassed White Wolf.  However, the resort prospered due to increased traffic to the High Sierra, even though White Wolf was no longer on the main road.  In 1951, the Meyer family sold White Wolf to the National Park Service for $25,000.

Bearpaw High Sierra Camp

Bearpaw High Sierra Camp was founded in 1934, and is located in Sequoia National Park on the High Sierra Trail, which crosses the Sierra Nevada from west to east.

Sequoia High Sierra Camp

Located in Giant Sequoia National Monument,  the Sequoia High Sierra Camp – established in 2006 – is the newest and most luxurious of the camps.

Mitchell Peak  is three miles away and its summit offers "top-of-the-world views of nearly 100 miles of Sierra Crest, Kings Canyon, the Monarch Divide and dozens of peaks, canyons and points of renown."

References

External links
Yosemite High Sierra Camps
Bearpaw High Sierra Camp
the Sequoia High Sierra Camp
Independnt Sierra Camp Reviews

Campgrounds in Yosemite National Park
Mountain huts in the United States
Sequoia National Park